Trent Sherfield (born February 26, 1996) is an American football wide receiver for the Buffalo Bills. He played college football at Vanderbilt.

College career 
Sherfield finished his Vanderbilt career with 136 receptions for 1,869 yards, ranked eighth in school history for both. As a senior captain, he had 50 receptions for a team-leading and career high 729 yards and five touchdowns.

Professional career

Arizona Cardinals
Sherfield signed with the Arizona Cardinals as an undrafted free agent on May 9, 2018. On August 23, 2018, during a preseason game against the Dallas Cowboys, Sherfield recovered a blocked punt for a touchdown. A week later, in a game against the Denver Broncos, he caught two passes for 44 yards. Sherfield played in 13 games with two starts as a rookie, finishing with 19 receptions for 210 yards and one touchdown.

Sherfield was placed on the reserve/COVID-19 list by the Cardinals on November 27, 2020, and activated on December 2.

San Francisco 49ers
Sherfield signed with the San Francisco 49ers on March 19, 2021. After his preseason performance of 5 receptions for 156 yards and a touchdown over 3 games, Sherfield was officially listed on the 49ers 53-man roster going into the 2021 season.

Miami Dolphins
Sherfield signed a one-year contract with the Miami Dolphins on March 18, 2022. During a game against the Buffalo Bills on September 25, 2022, a failed punt in the endzone from Thomas Morstead bounced off Sherfield's posterior and out of bounds, resulting in a safety, a play subsequently nicknamed the "Butt Punt"; the Dolphins ultimately won the game 21-19, also Miami's first win over Buffalo since the 2018 season.

Buffalo Bills
Sherfield signed a one-year contract with the Buffalo Bills on March 20, 2023.

References

External links 
Vanderbilt Commodores bio

1996 births
Living people
American football wide receivers
Arizona Cardinals players
People from Danville, Illinois
Players of American football from Illinois
San Francisco 49ers players
Vanderbilt Commodores football players
Miami Dolphins players